Laura Collins may refer to:
 Laura Angela Collins, Irish Traveller activist and author
 Laura Sedgwick Collins, American musician, composer and actress